Horace Silver Trio and Art Blakey - Sabu is a 1955 compilation album, featuring, primarily the Horace Silver Trio, but also includes two percussion-centric tracks featuring drummer Art Blakey and conga player Sabu. The tracks on this album are compiled from three sessions which were Silver's first as a leader. Originally released as an LP, it has subsequently been reissued on CD several times, including additional tracks not present on the original LP.

Background
Horace Silver Trio and Art Blakey - Sabu was the second 12" Blue Note album released under Silver's name, but was recorded earlier. The album compiles tracks from three sessions in 1953 and 1954 featuring Silver, Blakey and three different bassists: Gene Ramey, Curly Russell and Percy Heath. All of these tracks were previously released on two earlier 10" LPs – Introducing the Horace Silver Trio (BLP 5018) and Horace Silver Trio, Vol. 2 and Art Blakey - Sabu (BLP 5034). While the original 12" LP omitted four tracks from these earlier 10" LPs, the CD reissue includes all 16 tracks from the original sessions.

Track listing

Original LP

CD reissue

(*) Originally Released on Introducing the Horace Silver Trio (BLP 5018)
(**) Originally Released on Horace Silver Trio, Vol. 2 and Art Blakey - Sabu (BLP 5034)

Personnel

Performance
 Horace Silver - piano (except tracks A4, B4 LP; 15, 16 CD)
 Art Blakey - drums
 Gene Ramey - double bass (tracks A1, A5 LP; 1-3 CD)
 Curley Russell - double bass (tracks A2, A3, A6 LP; 4-8 CD)
 Percy Heath - double bass (tracks B1-B3, B5, B6 LP; 9-14 CD)
 Sabu - conga (track A4 LP; 15 CD)

Production
 Alfred Lion - production
 Reid Miles - design
 Francis Wolff - photography
 Rudy Van Gelder - remastering
 Leonard Feather - liner notes

References

1955 albums
Horace Silver albums
Art Blakey albums
Albums produced by Alfred Lion
Blue Note Records albums